The Thai Ambassador in Mexico City is the official representative of the Government in Bangkok to the Government of Mexico and is concurrently accredited in Tegucigalpa, San Salvador, Managua, San José, Costa Rica, Havanna and Guatemala City.

List of representatives

 Mexico–Thailand relations

References 

Mexico
Thailand